The Hiló Formation (Kih) is a geological formation of the Altiplano Cundiboyacense, Eastern Ranges of the Colombian Andes. The fossiliferous formation has provided a great abundance of ammonites and other marine species.

Etymology 
The formation was defined and named in 1931 by Hubach after the Caserío Boquerón de Hiló in Anapoima.

Description

Lithologies 

Stratigraphy and depositional environment 
The Hiló Formation overlies the Capotes Formation and is overlain by the Simijaca Formation. The age has been estimated to be Late Albian to Early Cenomanian. Stratigraphically, the formation is time equivalent with the Une and Pacho Formations. The formation has been deposited in an open platform setting. The deposition is represented by a maximum flooding surface and pelagic to hemipelagic conditions.

Fossil content 
Fossils of Actinoceramus munsoni, Actinoceramus aff. subsulcatiformis, Beudanticeras cf. rebouli, Desmoceras latidorsatum, Eubrancoceras cf. aegoceratoides, Exogyra aff. texana, Goodhallites aguilerae, Inoceramus anglicus, Inoceramus cf. cadottensis, Inoceramus aff. dunveganensis, Inoceramus aff. etheridgei, Inoceramus cf. ewaldi, Inoceramus aff. irenensis, Inoceramus prefragilis, Inoceramus cf. richensis, Lyelliceras pseudolyelli, Mojsisovicsia evansi, Mortoniceras arietiforme, Neocomiceramus neocomiensis, Neoharpoceras hugardianum, Oxytropidoceras intermedium, Oxytropidoceras karsteni, Oxytropidoceras laraense, Oxytropidoceras multicostatum, Oxytropidoceras nodosum, Oxytropidoceras peruvianum, ?Oxytropidoceras robustum, Oxytropidoceras venezolanum, Prolyelliceras gevreyi, Prolyelliceras prorsocurvatum, Puzio media, Tegoceras mosense, Acompsoceras sp., ?Bositra sp., Camptonectes sp., Entolium sp., Hamites sp., Hysteroceras sp., Mariella sp., Ostrea sp., Phelopteria sp., and ?Syncyclonema sp. have been found in the Hiló Formation.

Outcrops 

The Hiló Formation is apart from its type locality along the road from Apulo to Anapoima, found just east of Viotá, Cundinamarca, and in the department of Tolima. West of Guayabal de Síquima, the formation is offset by the Vianí Fault.

Regional correlations

See also 

 Geology of the Eastern Hills
 Geology of the Ocetá Páramo
 Geology of the Altiplano Cundiboyacense

References

Bibliography

Maps 
 
 
 

Geologic formations of Colombia
Cretaceous Colombia
Lower Cretaceous Series of South America
Upper Cretaceous Series of South America
Albian Stage
Cenomanian Stage
Shale formations
Open marine deposits
Fossiliferous stratigraphic units of South America
Paleontology in Colombia
Formations
Formations
Formations
Muysccubun